Tatiana "Tania" Baillayre (13 December 1916 – 1 January 1991) was a Romanian artist.

She also studied at the Sorbonne in Paris. Baillayre painted portraits, landscapes and still lifes. Her paintings were shown in group exhibitions in France and the Soviet Union. She settled in Bucharest in 1937 and had a number of solo exhibitions there. Her paintings were also included in exhibitions of Romanian art in China, the Soviet Union, Brazil, Sweden and Italy.

She married painter Gheorghe Ceglokoff.

Baillayre died in Bucharest at the age of 74.

Her work is included in the collection of the National Museum of Art of Romania as well as other public and private collections.

Biography
Tatiana Baillayre, also known as Tania Baillayre or Balier, was the daughter of French painter August Baillayre (1879-1962), professor and director (1940-1941) of the Academy of Art in Chişinău.

He studied at the Faculty of Letters at the Sorbonne in Paris and then attended art courses at the Chisinau School of Fine Arts and the Academy of Arts in Bucharest where his professor was Jean Alexandru Steriadi and was awarded the 1940 Anastase Simu Award for Graphics.

Selected works 
 Flori - Flowers (a series of seven paintings, 1934)
 Studiu- Study (series, 1934)
 Schiţă – Sketch (1938)
 Nud – Nude (1938)
 Lăculeţe – Small ponds (1938)
 Cap - Head (1938) 
 Peisaj –landscape (print, 1938)
 Natură moartă – Still life (1938)
 Puntea veche din Banat – The old bridge at Banat (watercolor)
 Natură moartă sau statică – Still life (oil)
 Primăvară – Spring (Two color print)
 Chişinău (print)
 Zbor vechi – Ancient flight (print)
 Trandafirii galbeni – Yellow roses (watercolor)

References 

1916 births
1991 deaths
Romanian women painters
Romanian people of French descent
20th-century Romanian women artists